Cuts from the Tough Times is a compilation album by New Zealand group Dragon, released in January 1990 through Polydor Records. The album comprised all the tracks from their 1984 album, "Body and the Beat" and a selection of tracks from their 1986 album, "Dreams of Ordinary Men". The album has been re-released numerous times.

Track listing
"Rain" (Johanna Pigot, Marc Hunter, Todd Hunter) – 3:33
"Dreams of Ordinary Men " (Alan Mansfield, Doane Perry, Johanna Pigott, Todd Hunter, Todd Rundgren) – 4:02
"Speak No Evil" (Alan Mansfield, Johanna Pigott, Todd Hunter) – 3:34
"Western Girls" (Alan Mansfield, Marc Hunter, Sharon O'Neill, Todd Rundgren) – 4:10
"Promises" (Johanna Pigott, Marc Hunter, Todd Hunter) – 4:11
"Wilderworld" (Johanna Pigott, Marc Hunter, Todd Hunter) – 3:51
"Cry" (Todd Hunter) – 3:44
"Cool Down" (Alan Mansfield, Todd Hunter) – 4:21
"Body And The Beat" (Marc Hunter, Robert Taylor) – 4:26
"Witnessing" (Marc Hunter, Todd Hunter) – 4:39
"Magic" (Robert Taylor) – 3:57
"What Am I Gonna Do?" (Alan Mansfield, Kenny Jacobson, Robert Taylor, Paul Hewson, Todd Hunter) – 3:41
"Fool" (Johanna Pigott, Todd Hunter) – 3:31
"Start It Up"  (Alan Mansfield, Doane Perry, Johanna Pigott, Todd Hunter, Todd Rundgren) – 4:20
"Smoke" (Johanna Pigott, Marc Hunter, Todd Hunter) – 4:42

Release history

References

Dragon (band) albums
1990 greatest hits albums
Polydor Records albums
Compilation albums by New Zealand artists